Guzmania donnellsmithii is a plant species in the genus Guzmania. This species is native to Costa Rica, Panama, Nicaragua, and Ecuador.

Cultivars
 Guzmania 'Claudine'
 Guzmania 'Fantasia'
 Guzmania 'Marlebeca'

References

donnellsmithii
Flora of Central America
Flora of Ecuador
Plants described in 1903